The following is a list of exoplanet search projects.

Ground-based search projects

Space missions

Past and current

Planned

Proposed
 EXCEDE
 FINESSE
 Origins
 HabEx
 LUVOIR
 New Worlds Mission
 PEGASE

Canceled
 Darwin
 EChO
 Eddington
 Space Interferometry Mission
 Terrestrial Planet Finder

References

Exoplanetology
 
Search projects